Behind This Convent is a 2008 post Rwandan genocide documentary directed by Gilbert Ndahayo. It was premiered at the 28th Verona African Film Festival.

Synopsis 
On April 10, 1994, in the small town of Astrida in Rwanda, Génocidaires break into a convent. They loot and take hostage along the road. Then they take 200 Tutsis and execute them in a courtyard behind the convent. Returning home as a 13 year old, Ndahayo discovered the bodies of his family at a pit in his backyard.

Awards 

 Verona Award for Best African Film
 Signis Commendation for Best African documentary at Zanzibar International Film Festival (2008)

References 

2008 documentary films
Films about genocide
Documentary films about the Rwandan genocide